Robin Malmkvist (born 13 November 1987) is a Swedish former professional footballer.

Career
He started his career in Alvesta GIF youth team in 1996, staying with the club until 2000 when then moved to Östers IF. He debuted for Öster in 2005, at the age of 17, in Superettan, helping the club reach Allsvenskan. The time in Allsvenskan was only 1 year and Öster returned to Superettan, however, Robin missed large part of the season due to a cheekbone injury and saw the club get relegated again. Öster was promoted back to Superettan in 2009, however, Robin decided to leave the club and signed for Halmstads BK, which were looking for a replacement for departing Magnus Bahne. Malmkvist played the 2011 season on loan at Tromsø, as backup to Marcus Sahlman. Malmkvist played Norwegian and European cup matches for Tromsø, before getting his league debut on 10 July coming on as a first-half substitute for an injured Sahlman away to Vålerenga, a match Tromsø lost 2–0.

On 10 November 2019 he announced his retirement from football.

He has represented the Swedish U-21 national team in 2 games.

References

External links 
HBK profile 

1987 births
Living people
Swedish footballers
Sweden under-21 international footballers
Association football goalkeepers
Allsvenskan players
Eliteserien players
Superettan players
Östers IF players
Halmstads BK players
Tromsø IL players
Assyriska FF players